Park Ju-Young (born 5 July 1980) is a South Korean long-distance runner.

He finished fifth in the half marathon at the 2003 Summer Universiade, and fifteenth in the marathon at the 2007 World Championships.

His personal best time is 2:14:07 hours, achieved in November 2003 in Seoul.

Achievements

References

1980 births
Living people
South Korean male long-distance runners
South Korean male marathon runners
Competitors at the 2003 Summer Universiade
21st-century South Korean people